In the 1980 elections to the Punjab Legislative Assembly, the Congress party achieved an overall majority.

Result

Results by Constituency

Bye Elections

References 

State Assembly elections in Punjab, India
1980s in Punjab, India
Punjab